This is a list of the main career statistics of professional American tennis player Jennifer Brady.

Performance timelines

Only main-draw results in WTA Tour, Grand Slam tournaments, Fed Cup/Billie Jean King Cup and Olympic Games are included in win–loss records.

Singles
Current through the 2021 Western & Southern Open.

Doubles

Significant finals

Grand Slam tournaments

Singles: 1 (runner-up)

WTA career finals

Singles: 2 (1 title, 1 runner-up)

Doubles: 1 (1 title)

WTA 125 tournament finals

Singles: 1 (runner-up)

Doubles: 1 (runner-up)

ITF Circuit finals

Singles: 6 (4 titles, 2 runner–ups)

Doubles: 5 (5 titles)

WTA Tour career earnings
As of 1 November 2021

Career Grand Slam statistics

Grand Slam seedings
The tournaments won by Brady are in boldface, and advanced into finals by Brady are in italics.

Head-to-head-records

Record against top 10 players
Brady's record against players who have been ranked in the top 10. Active players are in boldface.

No. 1 wins

Top 10 wins

Notes

References

Brady, Jennifer